Tereza Mazancová (born 15 September 2002) is a Czech ice hockey player, most recently active in the Czech Women's Extraliga with HC Baník Příbram during the 2020–21 season.

As a junior player with the Czech national under-18 team, she participated in the IIHF Women's U18 World Championships in 2018, 2019, and 2020.

References

External links
 
 Tereza Mazancová at Hokej.cz 

Living people
2002 births
Sportspeople from Mladá Boleslav
Czech women's ice hockey forwards
Universiade medalists in ice hockey
Medalists at the 2023 Winter World University Games
Universiade bronze medalists for the Czech Republic